= Cromwell at Windsor Castle =

1828 painting by Eugène Delacroix

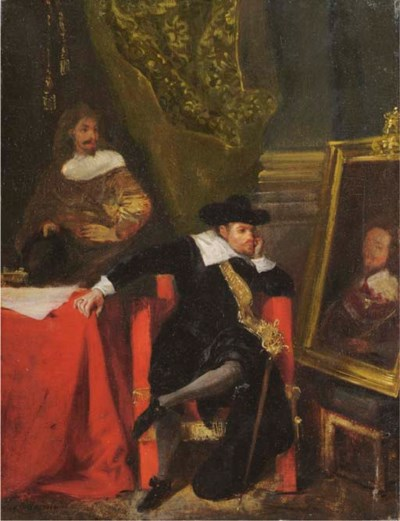
Cromwell at Windsor Castle (1828) by Eugène Delacroix

Cromwell at Windsor Castle is an oil on canvas painting by the French artist Eugène Delacroix, executed in 1828, now in the Galerie Hans, a private collection in Hamburg. It shows Oliver Cromwell at Windsor Castle, meditating on a portrait of Charles I.
